Xenodexia is a genus of poeciliid fish. It contains the single species Xenodexia ctenolepis, the Grijalva studfish, which is endemic to river basins in Guatemala where it lives in both slow- and fast-flowing waters.

References

Poeciliidae
Endemic fauna of Guatemala
Fish of Guatemala
Freshwater fish of Central America
Monotypic freshwater fish genera
Taxa named by Carl Leavitt Hubbs
Fish described in 1950